Ballyglass is a small village in central County Mayo in Ireland. It is situated about 10 miles from Castlebar, and closer to Claremorris and Ballinrobe.

Infrastructure
Ballyglass consists of one shop, two pubs, a primary school, a playschool, a community centre, a tennis court, a soccer pitch with a flood-lit training pitch, a soccer team  a post office and a Garda barracks. There is also a part-time dispensary. The Old Ground, now a public house, was originally built as a warehouse. A court house was situated where Murphy's guest house is today.

The Garda Barracks was originally built to house a hotel to support a planned train station. However, plans changed and no train station exists in Ballyglass today.

Excavation of the center-court tomb 
During the excavation of the center-court tomb in 1970, a rectangular timber house (neolithic house) was uncovered.

Education
Mountpleasant National School was built in 1888 and was the Community Centre, but was vacated in 1986.

A new playschool began construction in December 2008 when the then Minister of State for Children, Barry Andrews, visited Ballyglass and "turned the sod" for the new childcare facility. The new building was due to be built at the rear of the Mountpleasant National School.

Sport
Ballyglass Football Club was founded in 1975. It was originally housed in the Turlough, but moved uphill to their modern stadium, named Michael Keaveney Park. The club has won the Mayo Association Football League title twice.

Notable people
Denis Bingham (1829–1897), first-class cricketer

See also
 List of towns and villages in Ireland

References

Towns and villages in County Mayo